The Bagalamukhi Temple, Nalkheda is located on the banks of the Lakhundar River, a tributary of the Narmada River, in Nalkheda, a town in the Agar Malwa district of Madhya Pradesh, India. It is dedicated to the goddess Bagalamukhi, a devi of the Hindu religion and one of the ten Mahavidyas. She is associated with the colour yellow.

History
The temple is popular at the time of the Navaratri festival. It is one of three in India noted historically as having shrines to Bagalamukhi, the others being in Datia and Kangra, Himachal Pradesh. It was restored in 1815.

The brother of Prime Minister Narendra Modi chanted at the temple during the Lok Sabha elections. Other visitors over the years have included Bharatiya Janta Party MP Jagdambika Pal and MP Digvijaya Singh. P. C. Sharma visited the temple in March 2020.

Architecture
The unique feature of the temple is the triad, with Bagalamukhi central, and as an aspect of Parvati, between Lakshmi and Saraswati. There are also statues of Krishna, Hanuman and Bhairav at the temple.

Notes

Hindu temples in Madhya Pradesh
Shakti temples